Terms of Service; Didn't Read (ToS;DR) is a community project which aims to analyze and grade the terms of service (TOS) and privacy policies of major Internet sites and services. Each aspect of a TOS or privacy policy is assessed as positive, negative, or neutral. Services are graded from A (best) to E (worst) once a comprehensive list of cases has been reviewed by volunteer curators.
The name of the project is a play on the phrase too long; didn't read.

The project was founded in June 2012 by Hugo Roy, programmer Michiel de Jong and designer Jan-Christoph Borchardt. It was led by Hugo Roy, when he was a law student, from 2012 to 2015.

The project offers a browser extension for Google Chrome, Microsoft Edge, Apple Safari, Mozilla Firefox and Opera, which shows the grade and a short description of the privacy policy if a website is compatible.

History
Several sources of inspiration have been noted for ToS;DR, including Creative Commons' plain English summaries of licenses, EU energy efficiency ratings, and Aza Raskin's Privacy Icons.

See also
Index of articles related to terms of service and privacy policies

References

External links

Terms of service
Open content projects
Internet properties established in 2012
Collaborative projects
Contract law
Creative Commons-licensed websites
Legal websites
Free Firefox WebExtensions